This article lists notable people from Utica, New York.

Nineteenth century and earlier 
Alexander Bryan Johnson – Prominent Utica banker. Was a self taught philosopher and political writer, married to the grand daughter of president John Adams
Francis Marion Burdick – American legal scholar was mayor of Utica (1882-1883), (born at De Ruyter, New York)
John T. Clark, civil engineer and politician
Jane Elizabeth Dexter Conklin – poet, journalist, and religious writer 
Roscoe Conkling – U.S. Senator and Republican Stalwart political leader was Mayor of Utica and is buried there.
Marianne Cope – religious sister and Roman Catholic saint 
Arthur Bowen Davies – artist, was born in Utica.
Harold Frederic, author and journalist, was born and raised in Utica. His remains were buried in Utica's Forest Hill Cemetery.
Grace May North – author, was born in Utica.
Pádraig Phiarais Cúndún (1777–1856) – Irish-American homesteader and composer of American poetry in the Irish-language. Arrived in Utica in 1826 and buried there.
Horatio Seymour – New York State Governor and Democratic presidential candidate was a native of Utica and is buried there.
James Schoolcraft Sherman – U.S. Vice-President was born in Utica and is buried there.
Carrie Babcock Sherman – James Schoolcraft Sherman's wife, was born in Utica.
Gerrit Smith – social reformer, abolitionist, politician, and philanthropist was born in Utica.
Benjamin Walker – Revolutionary war soldier lived the last 20 years of his life in Utica.
Chandler J. Wells – former Mayor of Buffalo, New York, was born in Utica.

Twentieth and twenty-first century

Arts and entertainment 
Kim Bass, screenwriter, producer, and director
Mark Bodé – artist, was born in Utica; son of Vaughn Bodē
Vaughn Bodē – artist, was born in Utica. and graduated from Proctor High School;
Joe Bonamassa – blues musician 
Steven Brill – film producer, director and screenwriter
Neave Brown – London-based architect and artist
Dick Clark – lived briefly in Utica and began his television career there, hosting a country music show on WKTV.
Daryl Cobb – children's book author and national children's educational presenter, was born in Utica.
Fran Cosmo – musician of the band Boston
Tommy DeCarlo – musician of the band Boston
Debbie Friedman – singer-songwriter of Jewish religious-themed songs, was born in Utica
Annette Funicello – actress and singer was born in Utica on October 22, 1942. She poked mild fun at the city in her song "The Promised Land"  Funicello also makes reference to Utica in the 1960 Sherman Brothers authored song "Hawaiian Love Talk" singing: "I think that you're much cuter than the day we met in Utica".
Lincoln Holroyd – performer, bandleader and music educator in Utica from 1905 until his death in 1961.
Angela Johnson – singer born and raised in Utica.
moe. – jam rock band
Ron O'Neal – actor, was born in Utica.
Tiffany Pollard – actress and television personality, known for Flavor of Love and I Love New York

Sports 
George Burns – former Major League Baseball outfielder for the New York Giants, was born in Utica in 1889
Dave Cash – Major League Baseball infielder and three-time All-Star, was born in Utica in 1948
Robert Esche – National Hockey League goalie and sports executive affiliated with the Utica Comets
Richie Evans – race car driver
Chris Garrett – running back in Canadian Football League grew up in Utica 
Jim Jackson (sportscaster) – play by play broadcaster for the Philadelphia Flyers
Mark Lemke – former Major League Baseball player was born in Utica 
Art Mills – Major League Baseball pitcher and coach of the 1945 World Series  champion Detroit Tigers, was born in Utica in 1903 
Len Rossi – pro wrestler
Will Smith – NFL defensive end and New Orleans Saints Hall of Fame member graduated from Thomas R. Proctor High School in Utica
Andy Van Slyke – former Major League Baseball outfielder was born in Utica

Business 
Harry H. Bassett (1874–1926) – automaker, president of Buick (1920–1926), was born in Utica.
Steve Wynn – real estate developer, hotel and casino mogul

Politicians 

Mike Arcuri – former U.S. Congressman
Sherwood Boehlert – former U.S. Congressman
Fred J. Douglas – former U.S. Congressman
Rufus Elefante – Democratic political boss
Charles A. Talcott – former U.S. Congressman

Other 
Daniel Barwick – author, fundraiser, journalist, podcaster, higher education administrator, and teacher
Elizabeth E. Farrell (1870–1932) – educator
Michael Kernan – former Washington Post journalist
Cherilla Storrs Lowrey (1861–1918)–clubwoman in Hawaii, born in Utica
John D. MacDonald – best-selling crime novelist, grew up in Utica
Dan Senor – columnist, writer, and political advisor to Mitt Romney
John Zogby – political pollster

Fictional characters
Gary Chalmers – Superintendent of Springfield School District on the American television cartoon series The Simpsons
 Karen Filippelli – Regional Manager of Dunder Mifflin Utica Branch on the American television comedy The Office
 Uncle Leo - Alice Kramden's uncle in The Honeymooners

References

Utica, New York